The 1983 Asian Men's Handball Championship was the third Asian Championship, which was taking place from 25 September to 1 October 1983 in Seoul, South Korea.

Preliminary round

Group A

Group B

Final round

Semifinals

Bronze medal match

Gold medal match

Final standing

References
Results

Handball
Asian Handball Championships
Asian Men's Championship
H
Asian Men's Handball Championship
Asian Men's Handball Championship